Risperidone, sold under the brand name Risperdal among others, is an atypical antipsychotic used to treat schizophrenia and bipolar disorder. It is taken either by mouth or by injection (subcutaneous or intramuscular). The injectable versions are long-acting and last for 2–4 weeks.

Common side effects include movement problems, sleepiness, dizziness, trouble seeing, constipation, and increased weight. Serious side effects may include the potentially permanent movement disorder tardive dyskinesia, as well as neuroleptic malignant syndrome, an increased risk of suicide, and high blood sugar levels. In older people with psychosis as a result of dementia, it may increase the risk of death. It is unknown if it is safe for use in pregnancy. Its mechanism of action is not entirely clear, but is believed to be related to its action as a dopamine and serotonin antagonist.

Study of risperidone began in the late 1980s and it was approved for sale in the United States in 1993. It is on the World Health Organization's List of Essential Medicines. It is available as a generic medication. In 2020, it was the 138th most commonly prescribed medication in the United States, with more than 4million prescriptions.

Medical uses
Risperidone is mainly used for the treatment of schizophrenia, bipolar disorder, and irritability associated with autism.

Schizophrenia
Risperidone is effective in treating psychogenic polydipsia and the acute exacerbations of schizophrenia.

Studies evaluating the utility of risperidone by mouth for maintenance therapy have reached varying conclusions. A 2012 systematic review concluded that evidence is strong that risperidone is more effective than all first-generation antipsychotics other than haloperidol, but that evidence directly supporting its superiority to placebo is equivocal. A 2011 review concluded that risperidone is more effective in relapse prevention than other first- and second-generation antipsychotics with the exception of olanzapine and clozapine. A 2016 Cochrane review suggests that risperidone reduces the overall symptoms of schizophrenia, but firm conclusions are difficult to make due to very low-quality evidence. Data and information are scarce, poorly reported, and probably biased in favour of risperidone, with about half of the included trials developed by drug companies. The article raises concerns regarding the serious side effects of risperidone, such as parkinsonism. A 2011 Cochrane review compared risperidone with other atypical antipsychotics such as olanzapine for schizophrenia:

Long-acting injectable formulations of antipsychotic drugs provide improved compliance with therapy and reduce relapse rates relative to oral formulations. The efficacy of risperidone long-acting injection appears to be similar to that of long acting injectable forms of first generation antipsychotics.

Bipolar disorder
Second-generation antipsychotics, including risperidone, are effective in the treatment of manic symptoms in acute manic or mixed exacerbations of bipolar disorder. In children and adolescents, risperidone may be more effective than lithium or divalproex, but has more metabolic side effects. As maintenance therapy, long-acting injectable risperidone is effective for the prevention of manic episodes but not depressive episodes. The long-acting injectable form of risperidone may be advantageous over long acting first generation antipsychotics, as it is better tolerated (fewer extrapyramidal effects) and because long acting injectable formulations of first generation antipsychotics may increase the risk of depression.

Autism
Compared to placebo, risperidone treatment reduces certain problematic behaviors in autistic children, including aggression toward others, self-injury, challenging behaviour, and rapid mood changes. The evidence for its efficacy appears to be greater than that for alternative pharmacological treatments. Weight gain is an important adverse effect. Some authors recommend limiting the use of risperidone and aripiprazole to those with the most challenging behavioral disturbances in order to minimize the risk of drug-induced adverse effects. Evidence for the efficacy of risperidone in autistic adolescents and young adults is less persuasive.

Dementia
While antipsychotic medications such as risperidone have a slight benefit in people with dementia, they have been linked to higher incidence of death and stroke. Because of this increased risk of death, treatment of dementia-related psychosis with risperidone is not FDA approved and carries a black box warning. However many other jurisdictions regularly use it to control severe aggression and psychosis in those with dementia when other non-pharmacological interventions have failed and their pharmaceutical regulators have approved its use in this population.

Other uses 
Risperidone has shown promise in treating therapy-resistant obsessive-compulsive disorder, when serotonin reuptake inhibitors alone are not sufficient.

Risperidone has proven to be effective in treatment with Attention deficit hyperactivity disorder especially in cases of aggression or with another mental condition.

Risperidone has not demonstrated a benefit in the treatment of eating disorders or personality disorders, except for limited evidence in schizotypal personality disorder.

Forms 
Available forms of risperidone include tablet, oral dissolving tablet, oral solution, and powder and solvent for suspension for injection.

Adverse effects

Common side effects include movement problems, sleepiness, dizziness, trouble seeing, constipation, and increased weight. About 9 to 20% of people gained more than 7% of the baseline weight depending on the dose. Serious side effects may include the potentially permanent movement disorder tardive dyskinesia, as well as neuroleptic malignant syndrome, an increased risk of suicide, and high blood sugar levels. In older people with psychosis as a result of dementia, it may increase the risk of death.

While atypical antipsychotics appear to have a lower rate of movement problems as compared to typical antipsychotics, risperidone has a high risk of movement problems among the atypicals. Atypical antipsychotics, however, are associated with a greater amount of weight gain and other metabolic side effects.

Drug interactions
 Carbamazepine and other enzyme inducers may reduce plasma levels of risperidone. If a person is taking both carbamazepine and risperidone, the dose of risperidone will likely need to be increased. The new dose should not be more than twice the patient's original dose.
 CYP2D6 inhibitors, such as SSRI medications, may increase plasma levels of risperidone and those medications.
 Since risperidone can cause hypotension, its use should be monitored closely when a patient is also taking antihypertensive medicines to avoid severe low blood pressure.
 Risperidone and its metabolite paliperidone are reduced in efficacy by P-glycoprotein inducers such as St John's wort

Discontinuation
The British National Formulary recommends a gradual withdrawal when discontinuing antipsychotic treatment to avoid acute withdrawal syndrome or rapid relapse. Some have argued the additional somatic and psychiatric symptoms associated with dopaminergic super-sensitivity, including dyskinesia and acute psychosis, are common features of withdrawal in individuals treated with neuroleptics. This has led some to suggest the withdrawal process might itself be schizomimetic, producing schizophrenia-like symptoms even in previously healthy patients, indicating a possible pharmacological origin of mental illness in a yet unknown percentage of patients currently and previously treated with antipsychotics. This question is unresolved, and remains a highly controversial issue among professionals in the medical and mental health communities, as well as the public.

Dementia
Older people with dementia-related psychosis are at a higher risk of death.

Pharmacology

Pharmacodynamics

Risperidone has been classified as a "qualitatively atypical" antipsychotic agent with a relatively low incidence of extrapyramidal side effects (when given at low doses) that has more pronounced serotonin antagonism than dopamine antagonism. Risperidone contains the functional groups of benzisoxazole and piperidine as part of its molecular structure. Although not a butyrophenone, it was developed with the structures of benperidol and ketanserin as a basis. It has actions at several 5-HT (serotonin) receptor subtypes. These are 5-HT2C, linked to weight gain, 5-HT2A, linked to its antipsychotic action and relief of some of the extrapyramidal side effects experienced with the typical neuroleptics.

It has been found that D-amino acid oxidase, the enzyme that catalyses the breakdown of D-amino acids (e.g. D-alanine and D-serine — the neurotransmitters) is inhibited by risperidone.

Risperidone acts on the following receptors:

Dopamine receptors: This drug is an antagonist of the D1 (D1, and D5) as well as the D2 family (D2, D3 and D4) receptors, with 70-fold selectivity for the D2 family. It has "tight binding" properties, which means it has a long half-life. Like other antipsychotics, risperidone blocks the mesolimbic pathway, the prefrontal cortex limbic pathway, and the tuberoinfundibular pathway in the central nervous system. Risperidone may induce extrapyramidal side effects, akathisia and tremors, associated with diminished dopaminergic activity in the striatum. It can also cause sexual side effects, galactorrhoea, infertility, gynecomastia and, with chronic use reduced bone mineral density leading to breaks, all of which are associated with increased prolactin secretion.

Serotonin receptors: Its action at these receptor, mediated through an exceptionally strong 5ht2a/D2 ratio, is to prevent the drugs potential causing extrapyramidal side effects, like the reference substance clozapine. This strong binding affinity and through this a possibly competitive activation of specific brain regions led mice to alleviate amphetamine induced antagonism of dopamine receptors with administration of long-acting risperidone. 
However, these findings could only be regarded neurological, not psychological, as in one study conducted with monkeys, risperidone even increases the choice of methamphetamine over food.
So by having very strong 5ht2a receptor bindings with a much more wider range over the dopamine receptor than other atypicals it lacks a consistent high affinity for all the other co-occupied receptor systems (histaminergic, adrenergic, etc.) or at least has much lower binding affinities. Also other serotonin receptor systems are much less involved compared to other atypicals like olanzapine, which makes risperidone somehow unique.

Alpha α1 adrenergic receptors: This action accounts for the orthostatic hypotensive effects and perhaps some of the sedating effects of risperidone.

Alpha α2 adrenergic receptors: Risperidone's action at these receptors may cause greater positive, negative, affective, and cognitive symptom control.

Histamine H1 receptors: effects on these receptors account for its sedation and reduction in vigilance. This may also lead to drowsiness and weight gain.

Voltage-gated sodium channels: Because it accumulates in synaptic vesicles, Risperidone inhibits voltage-gated sodium channels at clinically used concentrations.

Pharmacokinetics
Risperidone undergoes hepatic metabolism and renal excretion. Lower doses are recommended for patients with severe liver and kidney disease. The active metabolite of risperidone, paliperidone, is also used as an antipsychotic.

Society and culture

Legal status 
Risperidone was approved by the United States Food and Drug Administration (FDA) in 1993 for the treatment of schizophrenia. In 2003, the FDA approved risperidone for the short-term treatment of the mixed and manic states associated with bipolar disorder. In 2006, the FDA approved risperidone for the treatment of irritability in autistic children and adolescents. The FDA's decision was based in part on a study of autistic people with severe and enduring problems of violent meltdowns, aggression, and self-injury; risperidone is not recommended for autistic people with mild aggression and explosive behavior without an enduring pattern. On 22 August 2007, risperidone was approved as the only drug agent available for treatment of schizophrenia in youths, ages 13–17; it was also approved that same day for treatment of bipolar disorder in youths and children, ages 10–17, joining lithium.

On 16 December 2021, the Committee for Medicinal Products for Human Use (CHMP) of the European Medicines Agency (EMA) adopted a positive opinion, recommending the granting of a marketing authorization for the medicinal product Okedi, intended for the treatment of schizophrenia in adults for whom tolerability and effectiveness has been established with oral risperidone. The applicant for this medicinal product is Laboratorios Farmacéuticos Rovi, S.A. Risperidone was approved for medical use in the European Union in February 2022.

Availability 
Janssen's patent on risperidone expired on 29 December 2003, opening the market for cheaper generic versions from other companies, and Janssen's exclusive marketing rights expired on 29 June 2004 (the result of a pediatric extension). It is available under many brand names worldwide.

Risperidone is available as a tablet, an oral solution, and an ampule, which is a depot injection.

Lawsuits 
On 11 April 2012, Johnson & Johnson (J&J) and its subsidiary Janssen Pharmaceuticals Inc. were fined $1.2 billion by Judge Timothy Davis Fox of the Sixth Division of the Sixth Judicial Circuit of the U.S. state of Arkansas. The jury found the companies had downplayed multiple risks associated with risperidone. The verdict was later reversed by the Arkansas state supreme court.

In August 2012, Johnson & Johnson agreed to pay $181 million to 36 U.S. states in order to settle claims that it had promoted risperidone and paliperidone for off-label uses including for dementia, anger management, and anxiety.

In November 2013, J&J was fined $2.2 billion for illegally marketing risperidone for use in people with dementia.

In 2015, Steven Brill posted a 15-part investigative journalism piece on J&J in The Huffington Post, called "America's most admired lawbreaker", which was focused on J&J's marketing of risperidone.

J&J has faced numerous civil lawsuits on behalf of children who were prescribed risperidone who grew breasts (a condition called gynecomastia); as of July 2016 there were about 1,500 cases in Pennsylvania state court in Philadelphia, and there had been a February 2015 verdict against J&J with $2.5 million awarded to a man from Alabama, a $1.75 million verdict against J&J that November, and in 2016 a $70 million verdict against J&J. In October 2019, a jury awarded a Pennsylvania man $8 billion in a verdict against J&J.

Brand names 
Brand names include Risperdal, Risperdal Consta, Risperdal M-Tab, Risperdal Quicklets, Risperlet, Okedi, and Perseris.

References

Further reading

External links

 

Alpha-1 blockers
Alpha-2 blockers
Atypical antipsychotics
Treatment of autism
Schering-Plough brands
Belgian inventions
Benzisoxazoles
Fluoroarenes
Galactagogues
H1 receptor antagonists
Johnson & Johnson brands
Janssen Pharmaceutica
Lactams
Mood stabilizers
Piperidines
Prolactin releasers
Pyrimidones
Serotonin receptor antagonists
Wikipedia medicine articles ready to translate
World Health Organization essential medicines